Belgrandiella intermedia was a species of very small freshwater snail, an aquatic gastropod mollusc in the family Hydrobiidae.

The International Union for the Conservation of Nature and Natural Resources (IUCN) has listed the species as extinct since 1996.

Range of distribution
This species was previously found in Central Europe, particularly in Austria.

External links
 IUCN listing
 Molluscs of Central Europe

Extinct gastropods
Hydrobiidae
Belgrandiella
Gastropods described in 1970